The Journal of Defense Modeling and Simulation is a quarterly peer-reviewed academic journal that covers the field of engineering, especially modeling and simulation as it relates to the military and defense. The editor-in-chief is Jerry M. Couretas (Lockheed Martin Corporation). It was established in 2004 and is currently published by SAGE Publications on behalf of the Society for Modeling and Simulation International.

Abstracting and indexing 
The Journal of Defense Modeling and Simulation is abstracted and indexed in:
 Biostatistica
 CompuMath Citation Index
 Current Contents/Engineering, Computing, & Technology
 Current Index to Statistics
 Engineering Citation Index
 Scopus

External links 
 

SAGE Publishing academic journals
English-language journals
Engineering journals
Military journals
Quarterly journals
Publications established in 2004